Pierre Lartigue, (born 22 October 1948) is a former French rally racing who won three editions of Rally Dakar (cars). 

He won the FIA World Cup for Cross-Country Rallies four times.

Rally Dakar

He won 21 stages in the African rally raid.

References

External links
 Pierre LARTIGUE - Histoires du sport automobile

1948 births
Living people
French rally drivers
Off-road racing drivers
Dakar Rally drivers
Dakar Rally winning drivers
Citroën Racing drivers